Draco blanfordii, commonly known as Blanford's flying dragon, Blanford’s flying lizard, or Blanford's gliding lizard, is a species of "flying" lizard in the family Agamidae. The species is endemic to Asia, and is capable of gliding from tree to tree.

Geographic range
D. blanfordii is found in Bangladesh, China (SW Yunnan), India, Malaysia (West), Myanmar, Thailand (East), and Vietnam,

Etymology
The specific name, blanfordii, is in honor of English geologist and naturalist  William Thomas Blanford of the Geological Survey of India in British India.

Description
D. blanfordii is similar to D. indochinensis. However, while the dewlap of D. indochinensis is widest at its base, decreases in width over its entire length, and terminates in a sharp point, in contrast, the dewlap of D. blanfordii is distally expanded with a basal constriction, and terminates in a rounded distal edge. D. indochinensis also differs from D. blanfordii in the presence (in both sexes) of a thick, black transverse band that extends across the posterior gular region from one throat lappet to the other, and in the presence of dark radial bands on the dorsal surfaces of the patagia in both sexes rather than in females only.

The head of D. blanfordii is small, and the snout is constricted, slightly longer than the diameter of the orbit. The nostril is directed upwards, perfectly vertical. The tympanum is naked, smaller than the eye-opening. The upper head-scales are unequal, keeled, with a prominent tubercle at the posterior corner of the orbit. There are nine upper labials. The male's gular appendage is longer than the head, very thin, covered with large scales. The male has a slight nuchal fold. The dorsal scales are  equal, smooth or very feebly keeled, not larger than the ventrals. There is a series of widely separated enlarged keeled scales along the side of the back. The fore limb stretched forwards extends considerably beyond the tip of the snout; the adpressed hind limb nearly reaches the axilla. Colouration is grey-brown above, with small dark spots. The wing-membranes which above are marbled with dark brown, with lighter spots and lines, are beneath immaculate. The throat is unspotted, greenish, pale scarlet beneath the lateral wattles.
D. blanfordii is the largest species of the genus.

Habitat

Behaviour
D. blanfordii is arboreal and diurnal

Diet
D. blanfordii preys upon ants.

Reproduction
D. blanfordii is oviparous.

References

Further reading
Barts M, Wilms T (2003). "Die Agamen der Welt ". Draco 4 (14): 4-23. (in German).
Blanford WT (1878). "Notes on some Reptilia from the Himalayas and Burma". Journal of the Asiatic Society of Bengal 47 (2): 125-131.
Boulenger GA (1885). Catalogue of the Lizards in the British Museum (Natural History). Second Edition. Volume I. Geckonidæ, Eublepharidæ, Uroplatidæ, Pygopodidæ, Agamidæ. London: Trustees of the British Museum (Natural History). (Taylor and Francis, printers). xii + 436 pp. + Plates I- XXXII. (Draco blanfordii, new species, pp. 267–268 + Plate XX, Figure 7).
Das I (2002). A Photographic Guide to Snakes and other Reptiles of India. Sanibel Island, Florida: Ralph Curtis Books. 144 pp. . ("Draco blanfordi [sic]", p. 75).
McGuire JA, Kiew BH (2001). "Phylogenetic systematics of Southeast Asian flying lizards (Iguania: Agamidae: Draco) as inferred from mitochondrial DNA sequence data". Biological Journal of the Linnean Society 72: 203-229.
Smith MA (1935). The Fauna of British India, Including Ceylon and Burma. Vol. II.—Sauria. London: Secretary of State for India in Council. (Taylor and Francis, printers). xiii + 440 pp. + Plate I + 2 maps. ("Draco blanfordi [sic]", pp. 141–142).

External links
http://www.ecologyasia.com/html-menu/species-list.htm

Reptiles of Bangladesh
Reptiles of Southeast Asia
Reptiles of Thailand
blanfordii
Taxa named by George Albert Boulenger
Reptiles described in 1885